Satyaprem Ki Katha is an upcoming Indian Hindi-language musical romantic drama film directed by Sameer Vidwans. Jointly produced by Nadiadwala Grandson Entertainment and Namah Pictures, it stars Kartik Aaryan and Kiara Advani. The film is scheduled to release theatrically on 29 June 2023.

Cast
Kartik Aaryan as Satyaprem "Sattu" Aggarwal
Kiara Advani as Katha Desai
Gajraj Rao as Sattu's father
Supriya Pathak as Sattu's mother

Production

Development
The film was officially announced with a motion poster on 23 June 2021 by Sajid Nadiadwala, to be directed by Sameer Vidwans and starring Kartik Aaryan. The title was originally slated to be Satyanarayan Ki Katha. It was later renamed Satyaprem Ki Katha due to controversy.

Casting
Kartik Aaryan was chosen to play the lead, in his first collaboration with Sajid Nadiadwala. It was later reported that Kiara Advani is cast opposite Aaryan, in their second film after Bhool Bhulaiyaa 2 (2022). Her inclusion in the film was confirmed in July 2022.

Filming
First schedule began on 3 September 2022 and in just a month the film got wrapped up on 6 October 2022.

Release

Satyaprem Ki Katha is scheduled for a theatrical release on 29 June 2023.

Reference

External links 

 Satyaprem Ki Katha at Bollywood Hungama

2023 films
2020s Hindi-language films
2020s Indian films
Indian romantic drama films